William H. Peters was a Wisconsin lawyer who served as a Democratic member of the Wisconsin State Assembly.

Biography
Peters was born on November 26, 1825 in Summerhill, New York. He became a lawyer.

Political career
Peters was a member of the Assembly during the 1878 session. Other positions he held include District Attorney of Marquette County, Wisconsin.

References

People from Cayuga County, New York
People from Marquette County, Wisconsin
Democratic Party members of the Wisconsin State Assembly
District attorneys in Wisconsin
1825 births
Year of death missing